Beibeilong (meaning "baby dragon") is a genus of large caenagnathid dinosaurs that lived in Asia during the Late Cretaceous epoch, about 96 million and 88 million years ago. The genus contains a single species, Beibeilong sinensis, named and described in 2017 based on an embryonic skeleton (nicknamed Baby Louie) and partial nest with large eggs that were discovered in the Gaogou Formation of China between 1992 and 1993.

The jaws were toothless and developed a horny beak (also known as rhamphotheca), as in most other oviraptorosaurs. Most of the anatomical traits of Beibeilong are consistent with caenagnathids rather than oviraptorids, which are two of the major oviraptorosaur families. It is classified within this group, Caenagnathidae, where it occupies a basal (primitive) position.

Beibeilong laid one the largest known type of dinosaur eggs, Macroelongatoolithus. The typical Macroelongatoolithus nest was ring-shaped with one or two layers of eggs, and the center was largely devoid of eggs. It is suggested that giant caenagnathids (like Beibeilong) sat directly in the empty-egg center to avoid egg-crushing because of their massive body dimensions. The paleoenvironments in which Beibeilong lived consisted of relatively mesic (humid, well-watered) floodplains cross-crossed by rivers with a semi-arid to tropical climate.

History of discovery

During the late 1980s and early 1990s, Chinese farmers excavated and collected a large amount of fossilized dinosaur eggs from Cretaceous rocks and sediments at the Henan Province (China), Gaogou Formation, many of which were embbeded in sediments. Although Chinese authorities tried to regulate the export and eventual illegal sell of the newly discovered dinosaur eggs, many ended up outside the country away from rightful paleontological research, such as rock and gem shows, markets and/or stores during the early 1990s. While they were kept out of China, many of the blocks containing dinosaur eggs were prepared (cleaned) in other countries, which revealed exceptionally preserved embryos in some cases.

Prior to the preparation of the block, this specimen was in 1993 imported into the United States by The Stone Company, which was responsible for the preparation. Some time later, the specimen was in 1996 featured on the cover article for the National Geographic Magazine where the embryonic skeleton was nicknamed as Baby Louie in honor of Louis Psihoyos, who was the photographer for that article. In 2001 the specimen was acquired by the Indianapolis Children’s Museum, where it was publicly exhibited for about 12 years. Even though the original intention of the museum was to repatriate the specimen to China, it was not until 2013 where agreements and documentation became finalized. Nearly 20 years after its initial discovery, in December 2013 the specimen was finally repatriated to China, permanently resting at the Henan Geological Museum.

Despite the return of Baby Louie to China, the whereabouts of its exact locality of excavation remained unknown. In 2015 paleontologists Hanyong Pu, Philip J. Currie, Junchang Lü, Eva B. Koppelhus, and Songhai Jia in company of Mr. Zhang Fengchen—who participated in the initial discovery of the specimen—, reexamined the purported type locality of excavation, corresponding to the Heimaogou of the Xixia County in outcrops assigned to the Late Cretaceous Gaogou Formation (Xixia Basin). The team found eggshell fragments that are otherwise identical to those observed on the eggs associated with Baby Louie, effectively establishing the locality of provenance.

Finally in 2017, the entire specimen was formally described by Pu and colleagues, naming the new genus and type species Beibeilong sinensis. Baby Louie was assigned the specimen number HGM 41HIII1219 and designated as the holotype specimen for the taxon, represented by a partial semi-articulated embryonic oviraptorosaur skeleton on top of an associated partial nest of 6-8 Macroelongatoolithus eggs. They noted that preserved eggs are only a small section/block of what would have been the original nest. The generic name, Beibeilong, is derived from the Chinese Pinyin beibei (baby) and long (dragon), meaning "baby dragon". The specific name, sinensis, refers to its country of discovery, China (prefix Sino). With the formal naming and description of Beibeilong the team reported that remains attributed to a second embryo were found protruding from inside one of the eggs.

Description

The dimensions of Beibeilong were only surpassed or approached by the closely related Gigantoraptor.

Like other caenagnathids, Beibeilong would have been bipedal with well-developed legs. The head would have been small with a rhamphotheca (horny beak) at the tip of the jaws, supported by a long neck. The hands would have developed functional fingers that bore large curved unguals (claw bone). The trunk ended in a moderate-sized tail. It is well-known that many oviraptorosaur species had feathers, including caenagnathids such as Apatoraptor. As for gigantic oviraptorosaurs (like Gigantoraptor), it has been suggested that some of this integument was lost due to their body dimensions.

Skull

The skull of Beibeilong, like most caenagnathids, was edentulous (toothless) as it lacked alveoli (tooth sockets). The  (front bone of the upper jaw) had a rugose texture, likely developing a rhamphotheca. The  bones of Beibeilong were fused around the naris (nostril) openings and had several nutrient foramina (blood vessel attachments) on their external surface. The  (straight bone in front of the orbit) had an open-crescentic shape contributing to the anterior border of the orbit (eye socket).

A small depression on the top border of the posterior process (bony projection or extension) of the lacrimal allowed the frontal bone to overlap, which was unique to Beibeilong. The  was a rather domed bone and formed the upper border of the orbit as well as part of the skull roof. The  ("cheek" bone) was a long and rather thin bone making contact with the maxilla and lacrimal, as in most oviraptorosaurs, and gave shape to the lower border of the orbit. The  (small bony bar below the frontal), being the last bone involved in the orbit shape, was a short, slender, and curved element that extended between the anterior end of the frontal and top process of the jugal. The  was a tall and nearly triangular bone that was joined by the jugal.

The  (front bone of the lower jaw) of Beibeilong was relatively short and deep with proportions similar to that of other caenagnathids (such as Gigantoraptor or Microvenator), and had an overall plate/shovel-like tip with a downturned sharp edge. The posterior end of the dentary formed the external  (circular hole in the lower jaw). The  (bone that joined the dentary at its upper edge) had a fairly curved top border and formed a relatively low  (bony projection that extended upwards from the upper border of the surangular). It was connected to the top border of the dentary through an articular depression. The  (bone located just below the surangular) developed a convex crest-like articulation for the quadrate, which is mostly common in the distantly related oviraptorids. Distinctively, the articular bone of Beibeilong extended backwards into a retroarticular process that had a characteristic concave posterior facet.

Postcranial skeleton

The cervical neural arches (upper, and pointy vertebral region) of Beibeilong had low neural spines (bony spines developing upward from the top surface of the neural arch) and were X-shaped in top view. The  (hip vertebrae fused into a compact structure) of Beibeilong was formed by six sacral vertebrae. The  was strap-like and co-joined by the furcula.

The  was a large pelvic bone with a gently convex top border, and its  (a recurved anterior ilium expansion, also known as "ala") was longer than the squared off  (posterior ilium expansion), another distinct feature of Beibeilong. The  (hole in the pelvic girdle formed by the ilium, ischium, and pubis) had its top border formed by the ilium with a broad gentle arch.

The  (thigh bone) was robust compared to other bones, somewhat bowed, elongated, and slightly larger than the pubis. Furthermore, the accessory trochanter of the femur was poorly developed, an unique trait of Beibeilong. The  (shinbone) lacked the distinctive boss that is present on the lower end of the cnemial crest in most oviraptorosaurs. Both  crest and its condyle were low and poorly defined but connected to each other.

Eggs

The eggs of Beibeilong are identified as belonging to the oospecies Macroelongatoolithus xixiaensis, considered the largest known type of dinosaur eggs and thanks to the embryonic Beibeilong they are specifically attributed to giant caenagnathids. In its microscopic composition, the eggshell was a two-layered structure with an outer "continuous" layer and inner "mammillary/cone" layer. Although not considered a layer, the boundary separating both outer and inner layers was notably demarcated, undulatory, and wavy.

The eggshell of Beibeilong eggs was ornamented on its external surface, characterized by a rugose texture composed by scattered nodes and additional nodes forming ridge-like structures and irregular chain-like structures. Like other Macroelongatoolithus nests, a complete Beibeilong nest would have been ring-shaped with a center devoid of eggs.

Classification

Pu and team in 2017 considered Beibeilong to have been anatomically similar to, but more basal (primitive) than Gigantoraptor. This conclusion was consistently recovered in their phylogenetic analyses incorporating ontogenetically (growth) variable characteristics. Beibeilong was recovered within the oviraptorosaur family Caenagnathidae in a relatively basal position. Members of this family are distinguished from other oviraptorosaurs in their skeletal proportions, most notably in their skull anatomy. For instance, members of Oviraptoridae have deep and robust jaws, highly positioned nasal cavities, as well as different hand morphologies (such as the Heyuanninae subfamily). Caenagnathids, on the other hand, have more elongated, pointy, and flat skulls with low nasal cavities, and in turn their manual ungual anatomy is rather generic/simple. Despite their differences, it is known that both groups convergently developed cranial crests.

Below is the obtained cladogram by Pu and team in 2017:

Paleobiology

Ontogeny

In their 2017 description of Beibeilong, Pu and team compared embryonic Baby Louie to Gigantoraptor, which together represent informative stages in the ontogeny (growth) of giant caenagnathids. Elements like the dentary probably fused together after hatching and this element retained a consistent size (relative to other skull elements) during the growth of the individual. Although both taxa feature different mandible-to-femur length ratios (∼0.87 Beibeilong vs. 0.45 Gigantoraptor) indicating difference in relative skull sizes, it is most likely that these are product of their respective growth stages.

Shuo Wang and colleagues in 2018 concluded that caenagnathids experienced a dietary shift as they grew up, based on several features in the dentaries of caenagnathids (lateral occlusal grooves and ridges on the occlusal surfaces, interpreted as vestigial tooth sockets). According to the team, caenagnathids had teeth when young and were progressively lost during their growth. However, the perinate Baby Louie specimen of Beibeilong lack some these in spite of its young age. Wang and team suggested three scenarios for explaining the lack of vestigial alveoli in Beibeilong, arguing that this taxon was strictly edentulous; teeth were indeed present in Beibeilong but were lost before eruption of the null generation of teeth; or, that teeth erupted later and were lost at a much higher rate in Beibeilong than other caenagnathids, therefore, vestigial tooth structures should be preserved in more mature specimens.

In 2019, Gregory F. Funston with team strongly rejected this interpretation and hypothesis concerning the ontogeny of caenagnathids. They indicated that the phylogeny of Caenagnathidae, along with other primitive oviraptorosaurs such as Avimimus, strongly implies that simple dentaries lacking complex structures (such as vestigial alveoli) are the ancestral condition of caenagnathids. The second point made by Wang and colleagues was also considered unlikely, because it would require a slowdown in the development of a horny beak, which would in turn require caenagnathids to reacquire functional teeth from an edentulous ancestor, and also teeth would offer no adaptive benefit. Lastly, Funston and team rejected the third scenario given that Gigantoraptor—which is mostly similar to Beibeilong, and represents a very mature giant caenagnathid—lacks any occlusal ridges or grooves, hence disproving the hypothesis that Beibeilong and other caenagnathids had teeth and lost them during ontogeny.

Reproduction

Pu and team in 2017, based on comparisons with other Macroelongatoolithus egg clutches, noted that the arrangement and size of the eggs associated with Baby Louie indicates that the original nest would have been large and ring-shaped with a center devoid of eggs. The nest of Beibeilong was composed of two layers of eggs, despite most other Macroelongatoolithus nests preserving only a single layer of eggs. When brooding the nest, the adult would have sat in the centre of the clutch, as also proposed for the smaller oviraptorids. Most notably, the team suggested that the entire Beibeilong nest was likely in an advanced stage of incubation when it was buried given that perinate skeletal remains were found in association with 2–3 eggs in the block specimen, including Baby Louie itself. They also noted that Macroelontaoolithus (including eggs associated with Beibeilong) and other elongatoolithid eggs/nests are very similar in clutch configuration, overall morphology, as well as eggshell texture and histology. These traits indicate that both caenagnathids and oviraptorids probably had fairly comparable nesting behaviours, but also that these features are ancestral for at least the whole Caenagnathoidea (superfamily containing both Caenagnathidae and Oviraptoridae).

In 2018, Kohei Tanaka and team examined several egg clutches of numerous oviraptorosaur specimens, including egg clutches assigned to Macroelongatoolithus, in order to evaluate how the nest configuration correlates to the body size in oviraptorosaur incubation behavior. Eggshell porosity reflects that eggs of almost certainly all oviraptorosaurs were exposed in the nest without an external covering (such as substrate). Though most oviraptorosaur nests have eggs arranged in a circular fashion, the morphology of the nest is different from smaller to larger species. Small-bodied oviraptorosaurs (such as oviraptorids with small Elongatoolithus eggs) arranged their nests packed with eggs and a rather small nest center. In contrast, large-bodied oviraptorosaurs (like Beibeilong or Gigantoraptor with large Macroelongatoolithus eggs) built their nests in a ring-like fashion with a considerably large center devoid of eggss. These nest strategies indicate that whereas small-sized oviraptorosaurs sat directly on the eggs, gigantic oviraptorosaurs, such as Beibeilong or Gigantoraptor, likely sat on the central area devoid of eggs. Tanaka and colleagues pointed out that this adaptation was beneficial to avoid egg-crushing because of the body dimensions of nesting adults, and also could have allowed some body-contact during incubation in these giant oviraptorosaurs.

Paleoenvironment

Beibeilong is known from the Gaogou Formation located in the Xixia Basin, an unit that dates back to the Late Cretaceous epoch about 96 million and 88 million years ago (Cenomanian-Coniacian stages). This unit is separated into three members: an upper member characterized by alluvial fan and traction current deposits; and the middle and lower members including terrigenous clastic rocks belonging to alluvial fan and braided river sedimentation of intermittent muddy waters. The overall sedimentation across the Gaogou Formation, made up by floodplain and lacustrine conglomerates, sandstones and mudstones, indicate a dry subtropical or tropical climate during deposition. The geological horizon in which Baby Louie was found is interpreted as a flat and wide alluvial fan with subfacies-flowing microfacies.

Examinations made to the δ13C levels in several eggshells from the Gaogou Formation suggest that herbivorous dinosaurs of the Gaogou Formation paleoecosystem fed mainly on C3 plants and C4 plants, which also indicates sub-humid or sub-arid climate settings. Moreover, numerous scattered amber remains of conifer origin indicate that Araucariaceae was largely present in the Northern Hemisphere of Asia during the Late Cretaceous, including the paleoenvironments in which Beibeilong lived. The repeated presence of giant caenagnathids (such as the Bayan Shireh caenagnathid or Gigantoraptor) in fluvial-based sedimentation of geological formations suggests that these large oviraptorosaurs preferred mesic habitats (well-watered) habitats over xeric (desertic) ones.

Nevertheless, geological evidence from volcanic rocks of the Xionger Mountain found at the Zhaoying Village (where outcrops of the Gaogou Formation are present) indicates that the Gaogou paleoecosystem underwent hostile climate changes, characterized by a drying tendency. Changes in the humidity and precipitation levels negatively altered the paleoflora as well as both river and floodplain paleoenvironments, forcing herbivorous organisms to migrate between the foot of the mountain and flood plains. When the precipitation levels rose, the water bodies and floodplains became repopulated. In addition, carbonate carbon/oxygen isotope analyzes indicate that extended periods of climatic changes ultimately deteriorated the Gaogou Formation paleoecosystem as a whole, triggering the loss of foliage cover and by extent the extinction of the local herbivorous dinosaurs. Many of the fossilized eggs across this formation were likely unable to hatch due to the paleoenvironmental conditions.

The Gaogou Formation is extremely abundant in fossilized eggs, mostly those of dinosaurs and turtles. Other remains include multiple invertebrate taxa comprising fresh water non-marine bivalves, gastropods, ostracods, and abundant insect ichnotaxa (fossilized traces left by insect activity). Additional vertebrate taxa found in this unit include the sauropod Baotianmansaurus, and the nanhsiungchelyid turtle Yuchelys.

Taphonomy

The preservation state of Baby Louie indicates that this embryo was lying outside its parent egg when it was buried, and its orientation which is inconsistent with that of the eggs suggests that an external force removed it from its underlying egg to the eggs at the top. Elements like the skull have been damaged due to scavenging and erosion. For instance, the entire skull has collapsed into a horizontal layer, where bones from the right side are best visible, and the premaxillae and dentary tips were partially destroyed after the individual died. There are, however, indications of postmortem scavenging damage left by either osteophagous or boring (borings; tunnel-like holes) insects in skeletal areas, such as the lower portion of the right leg, ilium, upper end of femur, and others. In addition, numerous borings and other elongated burrows left by those organisms are found across Baby Louie. Most skeletal elements are disarticulated, such as the left dentary, overall neck, abdominal region, and limb elements. While not visible, it is suggested that the tail could lie underneath the rest of the body and/or matrix, or alternatively it was ripped off by scavenging predators.

See also

 Timeline of oviraptorosaur research

References

External links
 
 

Late Cretaceous dinosaurs of Asia
Oviraptorosaurs
Fossil taxa described in 2017